The following is a list of squads for each nation competing in football at the 1946 Central American and Caribbean Games in Barranquilla.

Colombia
Head coach:  José Arana Cruz

Costa Rica
Head coach:  Hernán Bolaños

Curaçao
Head coach:

Guatemala
Head coach:  Juan Francisco Aguirre,  Manuel Felipe Carrera

Panama
Head coach:  Óscar Rendoll Gómez

Puerto Rico
Head coach:

Venezuela
Head coach:  Sixto Soler

References

External links
 

1946 Central American and Caribbean Games
1946
1946
1946 in Central America